Alexander of Scotland may refer to:

 King Alexander I of Scotland or Alaxandair mac Maíl Coluim (c. 1078–1124), King of Scots, called "The Fierce"
 King Alexander II of Scotland (1198–1249), King of Scots, only son of William the Lion and Ermengarde of Beaumont
 King Alexander III of Scotland (1241–1286), King of Scots, only son of Alexander II by his second wife Marie de Coucy
 Alexander, Prince of Scotland (1264–1284), son of King Alexander III